"Dear Dad... Three" is the ninth episode of the second season of the American television series M*A*S*H, and the 33rd episode overall. The episode's title follows the format of two episodes from the show's first season: "Dear Dad" and "Dear Dad...Again". "Dear Dad... Three" aired on November 10, 1973.

Plot

Hawkeye writes another letter home to his father, detailing some of the recent events at the 4077th: amongst the latest batch of wounded is a soldier with a live grenade shot into his body, and Sergeant Condon, who reminds the doctors to give him the "right color" blood. Hawkeye, Trapper and Ginger decide to teach Condon a lesson on racism.  The monthly staff meeting was also held—-although the previous meeting was held six months earlier—and the latest meeting appears to be no more productive than the previous one, which, according to Radar's minutes, was "declared a shambles".  Henry also receives a home movie of his daughter's birthday party from his wife, which he watches in his office with Hawkeye, Trapper and Radar-—along with footage from a few years previously of Henry and his wife goofing in front of the camera with their neighbors.

Notes

"Dear Dad... Three" was the first of four episodes to feature home movies in the episode plot.  The season three episode "There is Nothing Like a Nurse" featured the main male characters, minus Frank Burns, watching a home movie of Frank's wedding. The season four episode "Mail Call...Again" featured the main characters watching a movie of Radar's family sitting down to Sunday lunch at the family farm in Ottumwa, Iowa. The season nine episode "Oh, How We Danced" featured the main characters throwing a surprise anniversary party for B.J. and showing him a movie his wife Peg made for him based on surreptitiously-made recordings Hawkeye made of B.J. describing a routine day in the life of the Hunnicutt home.

This episode also contains a claim that Dr. Charles Drew [died April 1, 1950], known for his pioneering work with blood plasma, died in a North Carolina hospital which refused to admit him or treat his injuries based on his race. This claim, although widely repeated, is false.

References

External links

M*A*S*H (season 2) episodes
1973 American television episodes